Universal Studios Home Entertainment released Murder, She Wrote on DVD on October 1, 2013. All twelve seasons and four TV movies are available in Regions 1, 2, and 4. The DVDs have also been released in several countries around the world dubbed in their respective languages. All 264 episodes from twelve seasons are included, re-packaged on 63 discs. The TV movies are not included with this set but were released as a separate two-DVD set.

Special features
The first and second season sets lacked in any special features other than previews of other Universal releases. Seasons three through seven, ten, and eleven have had some sort of bonus included (except for season five in Region 2).

The season three set includes the Magnum, P.I. crossover episode, "Novel Connection", but was originally going to include an episode from season four. The season also includes a documentary about iconic 1980s TV shows called "The Great '80s TV Flashback".

The season four set includes a bonus episode from season five, and the fifth, sixth, and seventh seasons feature exclusive interviews with the cast and crew (the Region 2 release of season five did not include the interview).

The Region 1 release of season six includes "America's Top Sleuths", a documentary about the best American TV sleuths, as well as the interview "Recipe for a Hit". These bonus features were not included on the Region 2 release.

Universal asked fans whether the episode "Amsterdam Kill" should be released with the season ten set since it was produced during the tenth season, or if it should be included with season eleven, when it originally aired. After fans contacted TVShowsOnDVD.com with their views, Universal decided to put the episode on both releases as the results were split. Due to this, the episode was a bonus feature on the season ten DVD and a regular episode on the season eleven release.

The season eleven DVDs includes two bonus episodes from the show's twelfth and final season, "Big Easy Murder" and "Home Care".

In addition to the regular bonus features, most Region 2 releases also have a Universal Playback trailer showcasing classic and cult TV releases from the studio.

Cover art
Region 2 versions of seasons five and six have slightly different cover art from the Region 1 releases, with different pictures replacing the originals. Universal Playback have not given a reason for this, although the season six image may have been changed because the original picture was used on the back of the season one release in both regions.

The Region 4 release of season eleven used the same picture for the front cover art as the one used for season ten.

Season releases

TV movies release

Other releases

Blu-ray
In France, on November, 12, 2019, Universal Studios worked with the French company Elephant Films to release the first 6 Seasons of Murder She Wrote on Blu-Ray under the title "Arabesque".  The set is Region Free (Region A/B/C) which means it will play on any bluray player in the world.  The set has the original English audio version & the French dubbed version.  The set is available in the USA at Amazon.com.  So far Elephant Films has not released the subsequent seasons in the series.

References

External links
Official Murder, She Wrote DVD site
Murder, She Wrote at Universal Playback

Murder, She Wrote
Murder, She Wrote